Mahidol University International Demonstration School (MUIDS) is a co-educational, international high school owned and operated by Mahidol University. The school is located on the Mahidol Salaya campus twenty-five kilometers west of Bangkok, Thailand. 

The MUIDS curriculum is a synthesis of the Content Standards for California Public Schools and the Thailand Ministry of Education Content Standards for Basic Education. MUIDS graduates study at Thai, Thai international, and international universities. MUIDS is certified by Western Association of Schools and Colleges (WASC) as well as the Thai Ministry of Education.

History 
In 2008, Mahidol University conducted a study to determine the possibility of creating an international demonstration school as a feeder school for the university. In 2010,  the university assembled a board of directors who lead the creation of MUIDS. The school officially opened in the fall of 2013 and graduated its first senior class in the summer of 2016.

Curriculum 
The core curriculum (math, science, English, social studies, etc.) at MUIDS is supported by coursework in required electives (technology, physical education, fine arts) and career-based electives (business, medicine, etc.). Advanced Placement (AP) courses are also available for students. The Thai Ministry of Education mandates that all students take Thai Language and Civics courses. Native and non-native speakers take separate classes. Some faculties in Thai universities require significantly more math and science credits than international universities. MUIDS counselors help students navigate this complex process. The school combines the Thai Ministry of Education and American Common Core Standards. 

Students are required to earn twenty community service hours per year as well as one hundred learner development hours through clubs and activities. They may choose from several electives such as Intro to Software Engineering, Zoology, and even Entrepreneurship.

School year 
The MUIDS school year begins in August and ends in June. It consists of one hundred and eighty school days stretched across four quarters. The school observes Thai and Buddhist holidays as well as certain Western holidays.

The academic program is organized on a period schedule. Classes are year-long; each period meets anywhere from one to five times a week. MUIDS students earn a minimum of 81 credits over a three-year period. They must earn at least 27 credits every school year.

At the end of the school year students and teachers participate in “Week Without Walls,” spending a week of school outside of the classroom learning in a non-conventional environment. This one-week trip always takes place outside the city of Bangkok.

Extracurricular activities 
The student activities program is designed to complement and enrich the academic program as well as provide avenues for further development. More than thirty after school activities and clubs are available for students. Among them are Model United Nations, Junior Achievement, and Yearbook. MUIDS sports teams compete with other schools throughout Thailand. Thai students can also join ROTC.

Faculty 
67 faculty members work at MUIDS. Roughly one third are Thai nationals, one third are Americans, and around ten percent are British. Remaining teachers come from Bangladesh, India, the Netherlands, the Philippines, and Canada. Over a third hold master's degrees.

Student body 
664 students currently attend MUIDS of which the majority are Thai. Just over 80% of them live in the greater Bangkok area, while the remaining Thai students come from other Thai provinces. Non-Thai students are Japanese, Kuwaitis, Taiwanese, Chinese, Bahraini, Vietnamese, and Korean.

References

External links

Schools in Thailand
Educational institutions established in 2013
2013 establishments in Thailand